In the South may refer to:
 In the South (Alassio), a concert overture by Edward Elgar
 In the South (short story), a work of fiction by Salman Rushdie